Lava Kusa (also spelled as Lava Kusha) is a 1963 Indian Hindu mythological film directed by C. S. Rao and his father C. Pullayya. The film was scripted by Sadasivabrahmam, Samudrala Sr. along with C. S. Rao and C. Pullayya. The film was produced by Sankara Reddy under Lalita Sivajyothi Films. Lava Kusa is the first full-length colour film of Telugu cinema.

The film was a remake of 1934 film of same name which was also directed by C. Pullayya. The story is an adaptation of the Uttara Kanda from Ramayana. It revolves around the roles of Lava and Kusa, sons of Rama (N. T. Rama Rao) and Sita (Anjali Devi). Chittoor Nagayya, Kantha Rao, Sobhan Babu, S. Varalakshmi, Kaikala Satyanarayana play supporting roles. The film was shot in both Telugu and Tamil languages with the same title, but with slight differences in the cast.

Production began in 1958 but was stopped due to financial constraints. When it restarted, C. Pullayya's health was deteriorating, so his son C. S. Rao took over. The soundtrack features 27 songs, with the musical score primarily composed by Ghantasala and K. V. Mahadevan, and the lyrics by Sadasivabrahmam and Samudrala Sr. (Telugu) and Maruthakasi (Tamil). The Telugu version of Lava Kusa was released on 29 March 1963, while the Tamil version was released the following month, on 19 April. The former won the National Film Award for Best Feature Film in Telugu for that year. It was also dubbed in Kannada, and later in Hindi in 1974. In 2011 the film was rebooted with the title Sri Rama Rajyam starring Nandamuri Balakrishna and Nayanthara in the lead.

Plot 
This movie is based on Uttara Kanda which is the later part of Ramayana written by Valmiki Maharshi. It depicts the lives of Lava and Kusa, the sons of Sita and Rama. The story depicts Sri Rama Pattabhishekam and the brief period of Rama Rajyam, Rama sending Seeta exile on hearing the accusations of a washerman, Birth of Lava and Kusa, their visit to Ayodhya, Ashwamedha Yagna and conflict between Rama and his sons and Pattabhishekam of Lava and Kusa and Rama finally ending his Avatar.

Cast

Production

Development 
A. Sankara Reddy wished to produce a film based on the Hindu epic Ramayana starring N. T. Rama Rao and Anjali Devi after watching them play the roles of Rama and Sita in the song "Murisenu Lokamu" from Charanadasi, the Telugu version of the 1956 Tamil language film Mathar Kula Manickam. C. Pullayya, who was planning to remake his 1934 Telugu language directorial Lava Kusa, agreed to direct it for Sankara Reddy's Lalitha Sivajyothi films. The remake, also titled Lava Kusa, is the first full-length colour film of Telugu cinema. Writer Vempati Sadasivabrahmam, who worked with Pullayya for Charanadasi, was chosen to write the remake's script. During the process, Sadasivabrahmam stayed faithful to the screenplay and the dialogue written for the original by Vallabhajosyula Ramanamurthy and Balijepalli Lakshmikantham respectively.

The production costs escalated because of Sankara Reddy's decision to make the film in colour. The film's production commenced in 1958 and got stuck due to lack of funds after completion of one-third of the planned portions. After five years, Sundarlal Nahata offered to provide funds in lieu of the film's distribution rights and B. Nagi Reddy provided studio facilities. By then, Pullayya's health deteriorated and Sankara Reddy approached B. N. Reddy to complete the film. Narasimha Reddy advised him to consider Pullayya's son C. S. Rao. Rao was reluctant, opining that nothing dramatic was left for him to film. Pullayya convinced Rao to take up the task, stating that the emotional scenes in Rama's palace were of equal importance to the story.

Casting 
Lava Kusa was filmed as a bilingual in Telugu and Tamil languages with differences in casting. Anaparthi Nagaraju and Viyyuri Subrahmanyam were cast as Lava and Kusa respectively in Telugu. For the Tamil version, they were replaced by Baby Uma and Master Murali. Subrahmanyam was cast after the makers saw him perform the same character in a play staged in Kakinada. He was a nine year old when the filming began and was 14 when the film released. Unlike Subrahmanyam, Nagaraju acted in a few films before Lava Kusa; Pullayya offered him the role after observing his work. Nagaraju was eight years old when the filming began.

Kanta Rao was cast for the role of Lakshmana. When the actor was being diagnosed for eosinophilia and became obese, he was offered the role of Shatrughna. Rama Rao insisted Sankara Reddy to let Kanta Rao play Lakshmana, and Sobhan Babu was signed to play Shatrughna. Kaikala Satyanarayana, Chittor V. Nagayya, and Sando Krishna were chosen to play the roles of Bharata, Valmiki, and Anjaneya respectively.

Filming 

Pullayya made Nagaraju and Subrahmanyam undergo training for an hour every day and memorise the dialogues and lyrics of the songs. Filming used to begin by 7:00 AM and would go on till 9:00 PM. However, the duo was relieved an hour before to ensure that they could sleep properly. According to them, Rama Rao and Anjali Devi were "committed to the core". When none of the crowns designed for him were suitable, Rama Rao used the one he used in Charanadasi which costed 140. In a particular scene, Nagaraju was supposed to cry and glycerine was used. When it turned out to be ineffective, Anjali Devi slapped him and the scene was filmed. After its completion, she had to console him for almost fifteen minutes.

The climax sequences were filmed first, and because of delay in the film's production, the child artistes looked much aged in the earlier portions. When the scene of Rama embracing his sons was filmed, Pullayya arranged two small tables and asked Rama Rao to hug Nagaraju and Subrahmanyam, who were standing on them. The duo stated that this incident was an example of Pullayya's respect towards the lead character and the state of technology in use. Pullayya's associate G. V. R. Seshagiri Rao pointed to him that a pregnant Sita running towards Valmiki would look awkward, and the scene was reshot.

Music

Telugu version 
Soundtrack was composed by Ghantasala and lyrics by Vempati Sadasivabrahmam, Samudrala Sr. and Kosaraju.

All the tunes for all the songs for both languages are the same. The film has 37 songs and poems (padyams), many are very popular and memorable.

Tamil version 
Soundtrack was composed by K. V. Mahadevan and Ghantasala and lyrics by A. Maruthakasi.

Reception

Box office
The film ran for 75 weeks uninterruptedly which is an unbroken record in Telugu cinema. It was released in 26 centres and had a 100-day run in all the centers, which was a record and ran 150 days in all those centers and 175-day run in 18 centres. Due to the huge demand for the film from other centres in Andhra Pradesh, most prints had to be shifted to other centres. It had run for 100 days in 62 centres and 175-day run in 18 centres, grossing more than 1 crore. It ran over 1111 days

Accolades 
National Film Award for Best Feature Film in Telugu

Legacy 
Lava Kusa is considered a classic of Telugu cinema. In January 2007, M. L. Narasimham of The Hindu listed Lava Kusa with Mala Pilla (1938), Raithu Bidda (1939), Vara Vikrayam (1939), Bhakta Potana (1942), Shavukaru (1950), Malliswari (1951), Peddamanushulu (1954), and Mayabazar (1955) as films impacting society and Telugu cinema. Rama Rao reprised the role of Rama in a number of films over a two-decade career.

During a programme Telugu Cinema Prasthanam organised by the film society of Visakhapatnam, writer include actor Ravi Kondala Rao placed Lava Kusa among other cult films like Raja Harishchandra (1913), Bhakta Prahlada (1932), Mala Pilla (1938), Devadasu (1953), and Pathala Bhairavi during a speech on the role of Telugu cinema in the hundred years of Indian cinema. Bapu used Lava Kusa storyline in his 2011 film, Sri Rama Rajyam. Debutant Jaya Sreesivan named his 2015 comedy film as Lava Kusa which had no similarity with the film.

Notes

References

External links 
 

1960s multilingual films
1960s Tamil-language films
1960s Telugu-language films
1963 films
Best Telugu Feature Film National Film Award winners
Films based on the Ramayana
Films directed by C. Pullayya
Films directed by C. S. Rao
Films scored by Ghantasala (musician)
Films scored by K. V. Mahadevan
Hindu mythological films
Indian epic films
Indian multilingual films